White book may refer to:

 The German White Book claiming the causes of the 1914 war
 White paper, a type of official government publication
 The C Programming Language (book), by Brian Kernighan and Dennis Ritchie
 White Book of Rhydderch, manuscript of Welsh folklore
 White Book of Sarnen, a Swiss collection of medieval manuscripts
 White Book - German Occupation of Poland, an Extract of Note Addressed to The Allied and Neutral Powers
 White Book (CD standard), a standard for video compact discs.
 The Little White Book a short collection of creeds by Ben Klassen, founder of the Creativity sect
 White Booklet, alternative spelling list of the Dutch language

See also 
 Barebook
 Black Book (disambiguation)
 Blue book
Blue Book (disambiguation)
 Green Book (disambiguation)
 Orange Book (disambiguation)
 Pink Book (disambiguation)
 Plum Book
 Yellow Book (disambiguation)